Revolution in Our Time: The Black Panther Party's Promise to the People is a nonfiction book about the Black Panther Party, written by Kekla Magoon and published November 23, 2021 by Candlewick Press. In 2021, the book was a finalist for the National Book Award for Young People's Literature.

Reception 
Revolution in Our Time is a Junior Library Guild book.

The book received starred reviews from Booklist, Horn Book,Kirkus Reviews, Publishers Weekly, and School Library Journal.   

Kirkus Reviews referred to the book as a "highly readable and not-to-be-missed story of America’s history and current reality" Publishers Weekly called it a "detailed, accessible text" that "presents an incisive, in-depth study of the Black Panther Party." Booklist wrote, "This rounded accounting of a pivotal but often-overlooked time in U.S. history should be widely read." The Horn Book similarly wrote that "this compelling work would be invaluable for both individual and classroom reading," and Shelf Awareness said it is "a must-have for American history units that will spend more time in readers' hands than on the shelves." 

Horn Book, Kirkus Reviews, and Publishers Weekly named Revolution in Our Time one of the best young adult books of 2021.

The audiobook, narrated by Tyla Collier, received a positive review from Lit Hub.

References

External links 
 Official website

2021 non-fiction books
Books about race and ethnicity
Candlewick Press books
Works about the Black Panther Party